Beltway Park Church is a charismatic Christian megachurch located in Abilene, Texas. In 2015, Beltway Park averaged approximately 4,850 people in attendance each week. The head pastor is David McQueen.

History
The church was founded in 1985 by Pastor Glen Schmucker. Matt Chandler was on staff at Beltway Park from 1996 to 1999 and indicates this time as important in restoring his value for the local church.
Beltway Park has jumped into the Christian music industry with their album Heaven Came Down. This album was written and recorded by the Beltway college ministry. Beltway dropped Baptist from their name, symbolizing their distancing from traditional Baptist practice and theology and transition into a charismatic church.

Beltway Park has two campuses, one located on the south side of Abilene in the Wylie, Taylor County, Texas area, and the other in North Abilene near Abilene Christian University.

Growth
In late 2013, Beltway Park announced plans to construct a new satellite campus on the north side of Abilene. Construction began by December 2013 and was completed in the spring on 2015. The church has continued to grow with the North Campus presence and has shown a 45% increase in average attendance since 2010.

Beliefs

General

Beltway Park is a Protestant, bible-believing fellowship that adheres to Christian orthodoxy and is in accordance with radically reformed Christian doctrine.

Baptism
Beltway Park  is committed to credobaptism, immersion as a confession of faith. They offer classes on the subject as well as making water baptism a prerequisite to membership.

Miraculous
Beltway Park has adopted a charismatic Christian theology under McQueen's leadership. The church believes that all the gifts of the Holy Spirit, such as speaking in tongues and Faith healing are active in the church today. The church has a physical healing prayer team available for ministry. In the summer of 2015, a Word, Spirit, and Power conference was held and many were slain in the Spirit and some experienced holy laughter signifying the church's commitment and openness to the work of the Holy Spirit. The church has had charismatic ministers such as RT Kendall, Jack Taylor, Leif Hetland, Charles Carrin, Stacey Campbell, Larry Randolph, and Jonathan Cahn teach as guest speakers.

Israel
Beltway Park also teaches Christian Zionism, the belief in the importance of the evangelism of Israel in the church today in accordance with teachings of Don Finto.

References

External links

Buildings and structures in Abilene, Texas
Churches in Taylor County, Texas
Evangelical megachurches in the United States
Megachurches in Texas
Christian organizations established in 1985
1985 establishments in Texas